Mack McInnis (March 16, 1934 – March 31, 2013) was an American politician.

Born in Vernal, Mississippi, McInnis served in the United States Army during the Korean War. McInnis was a high school teacher and football coach in Leakesville, Mississippi. McInnis served in the Mississippi House of Representatives 1976-1980 and 1992-2000 as a Democrat. He died in Ocean Springs, Mississippi.

Notes

1934 births
2013 deaths
People from Greene County, Mississippi
Democratic Party members of the Mississippi House of Representatives
People from Leakesville, Mississippi
People from Ocean Springs, Mississippi